, also known by his Chinese style name , was a prince of the Ryukyu Kingdom.

Chatan Chōki was the second son of King Shō Eki, and was also a younger brother of King Shō Kei. He became the adopted son of Chatan Chōai because Chōai had no heir. After Chōai died in 1719, he became the second head of a royal family called Ufumura Udun.

Chōki was skilled at writing Waka and Classical Chinese poetry. According to the Zhongshan Chuanxin lu, Chinese envoys came to Ryukyu to install Shō Kei as the new king in 1720. Chōki wrote a Chinese poem to the Deputy Envoy Xu Baoguang. Xu also wrote a poem in response.

Chōki served as sessei from 1722 to 1739. During his term, he supported Sai On's reform, and signed many laws. Like his adopted father, he died without an heir.

The name "Prince Chatan" appeared in an Okinawan folktale: . In this folktale, Prince Chatan was skilled at go. He killed , a Vajrayana Buddhist monk, and was cursed, all his sons died young. The prototype of "Prince Chatan" is unclear. Some scholars considered him to be Chatan Chōki. Sai On supported Confucianism and suppressed Buddhism in his reform. Many Buddhists hated Sai On but dared not to satirize him, so they wove a tale to attack Chatan Chōki, who was an important supporter of Sai On. But others considered "Prince Chatan" to be Chatan Chōai, the adopted father of Chōki.

References

|-

Princes of Ryūkyū
Sessei
1703 births
1739 deaths
People of the Ryukyu Kingdom
Ryukyuan people
18th-century Ryukyuan people